Atopetholidae is a family of millipedes in the order Spirobolida. There are about 18 genera and at least 60 described species in Atopetholidae.

Genera

References

Further reading

 
 
 
 

Spirobolida
Millipede families